Inner Crisis is an album by American jazz pianist Larry Willis recorded in 1973 and released on the Groove Merchant label.

Reception 

Allmusic's Thom Jurek said: "Inner Crisis by Larry Willis is one of the very finest examples of electric jazz-funk from the mid-'70s. ... Willis assembled a session that was long on composition and tight on the big groove. Willis' long front lines accentuated deep soul and blues' cadences that were hallmarks of music that walked the line between tough lean groove and the pulsating rhythm of disco without losing its jazz roots to sterile fusion tropes, thanks in large part to his willingness as a pianist to play as part of an ensemble rather than as a soloist".

Track listing
All compositions by Larry Willis
 "Out on the Coast" – 4:30
 "153rd Street Theme" – 6:43
 "Inner Crisis" – 6:25
 "Bahamian Street Dance" – 4:32
 "For a Friend" – 6:58
 "Journey's End" – 7:11

Personnel
Larry Willis – piano, electric piano
Dave Bargeron − trombone (tracks 1, 4 & 6)
Harold Vick − tenor saxophone, soprano saxophone  
Roland Prince − guitar
Roderick Gaskin (tracks 2, 3 & 5) – bass guitar
Eddie Gómez (tracks 1, 4 & 6) – bass
Warren Benbow (tracks 1, 4 & 6), Al Foster (tracks 2, 3 & 5) − drums

References

Groove Merchant albums
Larry Willis albums
1973 albums
Albums produced by Sonny Lester